"Pezzo di cuore" is a song by Italian singers Emma Marrone e Alessandra Amoroso. It was written by Dario Faini and Davide Petrella and produced by Faini.

It was released by Universal Music Group and Polydor Records on 15 January 2021. "Pezzo di cuore" peaked at number 2 on the Italian FIMI Singles Chart and was certified platinum in Italy.

Background
About the collaboration, the singers explained "we are friends, accomplices, raised in the same land and with the same values: we do not need to hide from each other". The song is "a dialogue between two women, two friends, with two paths and two different personalities but both always in search of the truth of their emotions. The song, in fact, precisely speaks of this: to find the right way to experience feelings in an authentic way, starting from one's love for oneself".

Music video
The music video for the song was released on YouTube on 18 January 2021. It was realized in black & white and it was directed by Bendo.

Live performances
Emma Marrone and Alessandra Amoroso performed the song live for the first time on 16 January 2021, during the weekly episode of Amici di Maria De Filippi. They also performed it during the fourth evening of Sanremo Music Festival 2021.

Track listing

Charts

Certifications

References

2020s ballads
2021 singles
2021 songs
Alessandra Amoroso songs
Emma Marrone songs
Italian-language songs
Polydor Records singles
Songs written by Dario Faini
Songs written by Davide Petrella